Pavel Černý (born 11 October 1962 in Czechoslovakia) is a former Czech football player.

Černý is considered one of the best footballers ever to play for FC Hradec Králové, spent two seasons with Sparta Prague, played in Japan for Sanfrecce Hiroshima and made four appearances for the Czechoslovakia national football team.

Club statistics

National team statistics

References

External links
 
 

1962 births
Living people
Association football midfielders
Czechoslovak footballers
Czech footballers
Czech First League players
FC Hradec Králové players
AC Sparta Prague players
J1 League players
Sanfrecce Hiroshima players
Expatriate footballers in Japan
Czechoslovakia international footballers
Czechoslovak expatriate footballers
Czech expatriate footballers
Czechoslovak expatriate sportspeople in Japan
Czech expatriate sportspeople in Japan
People from Nové Město nad Metují
Sportspeople from the Hradec Králové Region